Admiral-General Luis Carrero Blanco (4 March 1904 – 20 December 1973) was a Spanish Navy officer and politician. A long-time confidant and right-hand man of dictator Francisco Franco, Carrero served as Spain's Premier and in various other high ranking offices of the Francoist dictatorship until his assassination in a car bombing in December 1973.

Upon graduating from the naval academy Carrero Blanco participated in the Rif War, and later the Spanish Civil War, in which he supported the Rebel faction. He became one of the most prominent figures in the Francoist dictatorship's power structure and held throughout his career a number of high-ranking offices such as those of Undersecretary of the Presidency from 1941 to 1967 and Franco's deputy from 1967 to 1973. He also was the main drafter behind the 1947 Law of Succession to the Headship of the State. Franco handpicked him as his successor in the role of head of government, with Carrero thereby taking office in June 1973.

Shortly after he became prime minister, Carrero Blanco was assassinated in Madrid in a streetside bombing on 20 December 1973 by the Basque nationalist group Euskadi Ta Askatasuna (ETA) while he was returning from Mass in his car.

Life

Early life 
Luis Carrero Blanco was born on 4 March 1904 in the coastal town of Santoña, province of Santander, to Camilo Carrero Gutiérrez (1879–1936), a lieutenant colonel in the Army stationed in nearby Santander, and Ángeles Blanco Abascal (1885–1910) a local woman.

By 18, he had already achieved the rank of lieutenant, serving aboard the dreadnought Alfonso XIII and participated in the Rif War from 1924 to 1926. In 1926, he decided to specialise in submarine warfare, and served as lieutenant commander on the B-2 and as commander on the B-5.

In 1929, he married María del Carmen Pichot y Villa (1909–1984) with whom he had five children.

Civil war 
At the outset of the Spanish Civil War, Carrero Blanco was a naval instructor teaching Submarine Tactics at the Naval Warfare College in Madrid. As a military man of conservative views he knew that he was marked; his brother José had already been detained and subsequently executed and his father died on the day of his arrest. Like many nationalists, he sought refuge first in the Mexican embassy and later that of France, from where he was able to cross the border from San Sebastián into France and re-enter on the Nationalist side in June 1937.

Carrero Blanco then served in the Nationalist navy first as corvette captain aboard the destroyer Huesca and later the submarine General Sanjurjo. Following the Nationalist victory and subsequent establishment of Generalísimo Franco as Caudillo of Spain, Carrero Blanco was appointed Chief of Naval Operations in August 1939.

Political career 

In May 1941 Franco appointed Carrero (age 37) as Under-Secretary of the Presidency of the Government, replacing Valentín Galarza Morante. Following the 1942 Begoña incident, Carrero advised Franco to remove Ramón Serrano Suñer from ministerial rank and from the post of president of the Political Junta of FET y de las JONS, and so Franco did. Carrero was—as Joan Maria Thomàs puts it—"extremely faithful and submissive to El Caudillo", a polar opposite of Suñer, of whom the dictator had become weary (despite their family connection).

Carrero Blanco was made Vice-Admiral in 1963 and Admiral in 1966. He was Deputy Prime Minister from 1967 to 1973. By that time Franco, even if he was still then the Head of State and concurrent Prime Minister, had already delegated the day-to-day running of the government over to Carrero Blanco himself, owing to the former's old age and illness. And the latter excelled in this regard, in terms of carrying Franco's policies and in directing the ministries towards that direction.

Upon the nomination of Juan Carlos of Bourbon as heir to Franco in the headship of State in 1969, it was believed that an authoritarian monarchy guided by Carrero would guarantee the continuation of Francoism without Franco, an idea underpinned by Franco's own words during the Bourbon's nominating speech:  ('all is tied down and well tied down').

Carrero reached the peak of his political career on 8 June 1973, when Franco—as envisaged in the 1967 Organic Law of the State that separated the functions of head of government from those of head of state—appointed Carrero as Prime Minister. 

The supporters of the aforementioned authoritarian monarchic continuation to the Francoist regime (the  solution) suffered two successive blows in the wake of the assassination of Carrero in 1973, and the overthrow of the neighbouring Portuguese regime in 1974.

Death

Six months after being named prime minister, Carrero Blanco was assassinated on 20 December 1973 in Madrid by four members of an ETA cell, who carried out a bombing near San Francisco de Borja Church on Calle de Serrano while he returned from daily mass in a Dodge 3700.

In a collective interview justifying the attack, the ETA bombers said:

 In his first speech to the Cortes on 12 February 1974, Carrero Blanco's successor as prime minister, Carlos Arias Navarro, promised liberalizing reforms including the right to form political associations. Though he was denounced by Falangists, the transition had begun.

Reprisal 
One of the members of the cell who had assassinated Carrero Blanco was himself assassinated by a car bomb in southern France on 21 December 1978 by a special team organized within the Navy. This group included a member of the Higher Centre of Defense Information secret service, another from the Naval Intelligence Service and the other belonged to the Defense High Command. In addition, it received assistance from a number of right-wing paramilitary groups through Jean-Pierre Cherid (OAS), José María Boccardo (Argentine Anticommunist Alliance) and Mario Ricci (Avanguardia Nazionale).

Argala, the codename by which the ETA member was known, was the only one who could identify the source who had handed Carrero Blanco's schedule and itinerary over to ETA. According to Leonidas, a former member of the Spanish Army who participated in the bombing against Argala, "The explosives came from a US base. I don't remember exactly if it was from Torrejón or Rota, but I do know that the Americans did not know what they would be used for. It was a personal favour for Pedro el Marino" (Pedro Martínez) who provided the explosives. Argala's assassination was claimed by the Spanish Basque Battalion. However, according to Leonidas, "BVE, ATE" (Anti-Terrorismo ETA) or "Triple A" are only labels of convenience that are used by the same group.

Funeral and burial
Carrero Blanco's funeral, which would be one of Franco's last public appearances, was held the following day at the Basilica of Saint Francis the Great, Madrid and he was buried at Mingorrubio Cemetery in the neighbouring municipality of El Pardo. Carrero was posthumously elevated to "Captain general of the Navy" and declared "Duke of Carrero Blanco".

Ideology and positions 

Carrero did not clearly belong to any family within the regime. His ultimate identification was with the work of the Dictator; as such, he can be considered a pure Francoist.  Antonio Elorza described the most distinct features of his ideology as being counter-revolution, anticommunism and satanization of Masonry, all according to a conspiracy theory of history, in line with a "degraded Augustinianism".

Also known for his antisemite diatribes, by 1941 he saw the state of affairs of a world at war as follows: "Spain, paladin of the Faith in Christ, is again (acting) against the true enemy: Judaism. ... Because the world, even if it does not look like it, lives in a permanent war of a religious type; it is the struggle of Christianity against Judaism. War to the death, as the fight of good against evil should be."

Carrero, who held paternalist views when assessing the Spanish presence in Africa, was hostile to the acceptance of the decolonisation process. As he declared that the Western Sahara "had not ever been controlled by the Moroccan Empire", he defended that the territory was "as Spanish as the province of Cuenca is".

Openly germanophile in his articles written for the Mundo magazine during the first part of World War II, after the turn in the conflict against the Axis Powers in 1943, he modulated his hostile discourse towards the Allied Powers in those pieces; finally, after the defeat of the Axis, he had wholly replaced the message attacking the liberal democracies by a merely anti-Soviet one. A defender of the idea that the victory of the Francoist side in the Civil War had happened "despite" an alleged international conspiracy against the former, years later, in the 1950s, he insisted again: "this is precisely the Spanish problem, Spain wants to implement the Good, and the forces of Evil, unleashed upon the world, try to prevent her from doing it".

He was reportedly among the endorsers of the so-called , an alleged secret plan to develop a nuclear weapon for Spain.

Regarding the future of a post-Franco Spain, Carrero, along with López Rodó, envisaged and promoted the idea of an authoritarian monarchy guaranteeing the continuity of Francoism.

Service summary

Orders, decorations and medals

Military 

 Grand Cross of Naval Merit with white distinction (1943)
 Grand Official of the Order of Africa (1961)
 Grand Cross of Military Merit with white distinction (1963)
 Grand Cross of Aeronautical Merit with white distinction (1967)

Civil 

 Grand Collar of the Imperial Order of the Yoke and Arrows (1939)
 Grand Cross of the Order of Isabella the Catholic (1942)
 Grand Cross of the Order of Charles III (1970)
 Grand Collar of the Order of Cisneros (1970)

Nobiliary 

 1st Duke of Carrero Blanco, Grandee of Spain (1973)

Works 
Carrero Blanco wrote a number of books on the Spanish navy and Spanish naval military history, as well as political treatises on Communism and Freemasonry (under the pseudonym Juan de la Cosa).

See also
 Cassandra case, student prosecuted for posting a series of tweets poking fun at the assassination of Luis Carrero Blanco

References
Notes

Citations

Bibliography
 
 
 
 
 
 
 
 
 
 
 

1904 births
1973 murders in Spain
1973 deaths
Antisemitism in Spain
Assassinated heads of government
Assassinated Spanish politicians
Burials at Mingorrubio Cemetery
Military personnel from Cantabria
Politicians from Cantabria
Captain generals of the Navy
Christian conspiracy theorists
Deaths by car bomb in Spain
Deaths by improvised explosive device
Deputy Prime Ministers of Spain
FET y de las JONS politicians
Francoists
Grandees of Spain
Male murder victims
Members of the Cortes Españolas
People from Santoña
People killed by ETA (separatist group)
People murdered in Spain
Prime Ministers of Spain
Spanish admirals
Spanish anti-communists
Spanish conspiracy theorists
Spanish military personnel of the Spanish Civil War (National faction)
Spanish monarchists
Spanish Roman Catholics